A death erection, angel lust, rigor erectus, or terminal erection is a post-mortem erection, technically a priapism, observed in the corpses of men who have been executed, particularly by hanging.

Overview

The phenomenon has been attributed to pressure on the cerebellum created by the noose. Spinal cord injuries are known to be associated with priapism. Injuries to the cerebellum or spinal cord are often associated with priapism in living patients.

Death by hanging, whether an execution or a suicide, has been observed to affect the genitals of both men and women. In women, the labia and clitoris may become engorged and there may be a discharge of blood from the vagina while in men, "a more or less complete state of erection of the penis, with discharge of urine, mucus or prostatic fluid is a frequent occurrence ... present for one in three cases." Other causes of death may also result in these effects, including fatal gunshots to the head, damage to major blood vessels, and violent death by poisoning. A postmortem priapism is an indicator that death was likely swift and violent.

In popular culture
 In The Sexuality of Christ in Renaissance Art and in Modern Oblivion, art historian and critic Leo Steinberg alleges that a number of Renaissance era artists depicted Jesus Christ after the crucifixion with a post-mortem erection, a motif which he named ostentatio genitalium. The artwork was suppressed by the Roman Catholic Church for several centuries.
 The "Cyclops" section of James Joyce's Ulysses makes multiple uses of the terminal erection as a motif.
 In The Decline and Fall of the Roman Empire, Edward Gibbon relates an anecdote attributed to Abulfeda that Ali, on the death of Muhammad, exclaimed,  (O prophet, thy penis is erect unto the sky). This understanding of the anecdote, however, is based on a mistranslation of the Arabic source by John Gagnier, who translated Abulfeda's Life of Muhammad into Latin. The English translation of the Arabic source should read: "In one account, ʿAlī, may God be best pleased with him, was called upon, while he was washing him [the Prophet], to raise his gaze to the sky."
 This phenomenon is a recurring theme in the writing of William S. Burroughs, appearing in many of his books including Naked Lunch and Cities of the Red Night.
 The movie Clerks refers to the phenomenon in a dark satirical manner. The scene in question involves a male customer passing away of a heart attack in the bathroom of the store after having recently read an adult magazine. The protagonist's girlfriend believes her boyfriend is the person in the bathroom and that he was waiting to surprise her.
 The Apple TV+ series Bad Sisters opens with one of the characters experiencing this while lying in his coffin shortly before his wake, while his wife desperately attempts to cover it up before guests arrive.

See also 
 Lazarus sign
 Livor mortis

References

External links

Human physiology
Andrology
Penis
Signs of death
Priapism